Katrina Begin (born August 10, 1982 in Minneapolis, Minnesota) is an American actress. She is widely known for her role as Sylvia in the 2007 film Remember the Daze. In television, she appeared in the TV movie Second Chance Christmas and guest starred on Grounded for Life, E-Ring, ER, Gossip Girl, The Protector, After Lately and had a four-episode on No Ordinary Family from 2010 to 2011. As well as appearing in the films Legacy (2008) and Zookeeper (2011).

Filmography

Film

Television

References

External links

1982 births
21st-century American actresses
American film actresses
American television actresses
Living people
Actresses from Minneapolis